MV Dubai Moon was a cargo ship which sank on (or soon after) May 21, 2010 due to strong waves caused by a tropical storm. The ship was carrying vehicles in the Gulf of Aden when she was struck by Cyclone Bandu, which pushed it off the track. The ship sent a distress call which was picked by Royal Navy frigate HMS Chatham. 23 crew members were rescued by the Westland Lynx helicopter from Chatham before Dubai Moon sank.

Sinking
[[Image:Mvdubaimoon rescue.jpg|thumb|250px|left|HMS Chatham'''s helicopter after successful rescue of the crew members]]
On May 20, 2010, HMS Chatham received a radio distress call from the master of MV Dubai Moon, Capt Hassan Madar.

At that time, the Panamanian-registered Dubai Moon was being blown towards the island of Abd al Kuri in the Gulf of Aden and there were fears that it would run aground on the island. Efforts to alter the ship's course caused it to list further and risked capsizing it. Chatham set course for the ship.Dubai Moon missed the island and dropped her anchors early on 21 May to try to stop as she was approaching the island of Jazirat Samhah. Although the anchors did not hold they prevented the ship from hitting a reef.

Weather conditions improved during the day so that Chatham'' was able to launch her helicopter to rescue the entire crew of 23 over a period of three hours, and the ship sank after the rescue. In an interview following his rescue, Captain Madar explained that his ship had been operating further out to sea than normal to avoid Somalian pirates, and was consequently unable to seek shelter in the storm.

References

Shipwrecks in the Red Sea
Maritime incidents in 2010
Cargo ships of Panama
1978 ships